Yves Afonso (13 February 1944 – 21 January 2018) was a French actor. He was born in  Saulieu in the Côte-d'Or département. Since his uncredited debut in the movie Masculin, féminin in 1966, he had many roles, both in movies and on television. He normally plays supporting roles, and may have been best known for his role as Inspector Bricard in L'Horloger de Saint-Paul, and the black comedy Week End, where he played Tom Thumb. He died on 21 January 2018 at the age of 73.

Selected filmography

 Masculin Féminin (1966) - L'homme qui se suicide (uncredited)
 Made in U.S.A (1966) - David Goodis
 Week End (1967) - Gros Poucet (uncredited)
 Time to Live (1969) - René
 Une veuve en or (1970) - Un membre de la bande à Raphaël (uncredited)
 Dossier prostitution (1970) - Le placeur (uncredited)
 Cannabis (1970) - (uncredited)
 Vladimir et Rosa (1971) - Yves - un étudiant révolutionnnaire (uncredited)
 La maffia du plaisir (1971) - Un naturiste
 La cavale (1971) - Un gendarme (uncredited)
 Valparaiso, Valparaiso (1971) - Anatole
 L'insolent (1973) - Petit René
 Les volets clos (1973)
 Les gants blancs du diable (1973) - Cartoni, le tueur à gages
 Défense de savoir (1973)
 The Clockmaker (1974) - Insp. Bricard
 Violins at the Ball (1974) - Le cameraman
 The Black Windmill (1974) - Jacques (uncredited)
 France société anonyme (1974) - L'homme de main du fourgueur
 Zig-Zag (1975) - Aldo Minelli, le patron du bar
 Le mâle du siècle (1975) - Louis Maboul
 Le Chat et la souris (1975) - William Daube - le gauchiste
 La Course à l'échalote (1975) - Le conducteur du train en bleu (uncredited)
 Les conquistadores (1976) - Le bagarreur de la République
 L'Aile ou la cuisse (1976) - Le faux plombier
 Le Juge Fayard dit Le Shériff (1977) - Lecca - un truand
 L'ange gardien (1978) - Le parisien
 Un balcon en forêt (1978) - Le caporal Olivon
 Les Charlots en délire (1979) - Le syndicaliste
 Le règlement intérieur (1980) - Le surveillant général
 Le rose et le blanc (1982) - Henry James
 One Deadly Summer (1983) - Rostollan
 Treasure Island (1985) - French Captain
 Maine-Ocean Express (1986) - Petitgas Marcel
 Double messieurs (1986) - Roger dit Léo
 O Desejado (1987) - Laurentino
 Brigade de nuit (1987)
 La travestie (1988) - Alain
 Radio Corbeau (1989) - Le commissaire Roustan
 Dédé (1990) - Maurice, le père
 Uranus (1990) - Le brigadier
 Gawin (1991) - Pais - le garagiste
 Les arcandiers (1991) - l'Ingénieur
 À la vitesse d'un cheval au galop (1992) - Ulysse - le chauffeur du car
 L'oeil écarlate (1993) - Romain
 Le Fils de Gascogne (1995) - Himself
 Excentric paradis (1996) - Riton
 Le coeur fantôme (1996) - Le voisin
 Tenue correcte exigée (1997) - Jacquot - un SDF
 Du bleu jusqu'en Amérique (1999) - Robert
 They Call This... Spring (2001) - Monsieur Maurice - le concierge collectionneur de vidéos porno
 Fifi Martingale (2001) - Yves Lempereur
 Mischka (2002) - Robert
 Code 68 (2005) - Hubert
 Déserts (2005)
 Le crime est notre affaire (2008) - L'inspecteur Blache
 Cruel (2014) - Maurice Ouari
 Sparring (2017) - Monsieur Jean (final film role)

References

External links
 

1944 births
2018 deaths
People from Saulieu
French male film actors